Gedatolisib (PF-05212384) is an experimental drug for treatment of cancer in development by Celcuity, Inc. The mechanism of action is accomplished by binding the different p110 catalytic subunit isoforms of  PI3K and the kinase site of mTOR.

The drug was originally developed by Wyeth, which Pfizer acquired in 2009. Gedatolisib is under development for patients with and without PIK3CA mutations.

Mechanism of action 

Gedatolisib acts as a dual mTOR/PI3K inhibitor.

mTOR inhibition 

mTOR is a downstream effector of PI3K and is also independently regulated by hormones, growth factors, and nutrients.  mTOR protein is found in two functionally distinct protein assemblies: mTOR complex 1 (mTORC1) and mTOR complex 2 (mTORC2). mTOR signaling serves as a central regulator of cell metabolism, growth, proliferation, and survival.  In cancer, dysfunctional mTOR signaling leads to various constitutive activities of both mTOR-involved complexes, making mTOR an important therapeutic target for cancer therapy. Gedatolisib also binds to mTOR to inhibit its activity.

PI3K inhibition 

Activation of the PI3K/mTOR pathway has been implicated in a wide variety of human cancers including carcinomas of the breast, prostate, lung, endometrial, colon, and ovary, among others. Each of the four catalytic isoforms of class I PI3K preferentially mediate signal transduction and tumor cell survival based on the type of malignancy and the genetic or epigenetic alterations an individual patient harbors. Activities associated with PI3K involve the regulation of diverse cellular processes, including cell proliferation, survival, cytoskeletal organization, and glucose transport and utilization.  Over activation of the PI3K pathway is frequently present in human malignancies and plays a key role in cancer progression.  Due to the multiple sub-cellular locations, activities, and importance of the different PI3K isoforms and complexes in regulating cancer cell proliferation, complete control of the PI3K pathway activity is an important target for efficacious cancer therapy. Gedatolisib binds to all PI3K catalytic subunit isoforms involved in oncogenic signaling approximately equally.

Clinical trials 
A number of early phase clinical trials of gedatolisib for treatment of endometrial cancer, colorectal cancer, acute myeloid leukemia have been conducted.

Current clinical trials are focused on breast cancer,

References 

Experimental cancer drugs
Pfizer brands
4-Morpholinyl compunds
Triazines
Ureas
Benzamides
Phosphoinositide 3-kinase inhibitors